Fındıqlıqışlaq is a village in the municipality of Peştəsər in the Yardymli Rayon of Azerbaijan.

References

Populated places in Yardimli District